Nectar is the second studio album by Japanese singer-songwriter Joji, released on 25 September 2020 via 88rising. It features the singles "Sanctuary", "Run", "Gimme Love", "Daylight" with Diplo, and "Your Man", as well as collaborations with Benee, Lil Yachty, Omar Apollo, Yves Tumor and Rei Brown.

Background
The album was announced on 17 April 2020 with the single "Gimme Love". It was originally set to be released on 10 July 2020; however, on 12 June 2020 Joji announced that the album had been delayed to 25 September 2020, citing the COVID-19 pandemic. Joji revealed the track listing on 11 September.

Track listing

Notes
  indicates an additional producer.
 "Modus" and "Nitrous" are stylized in all caps.

Personnel

Musicians
 George Miller – vocals
 Greg Kurstin – bass, Mellotron, piano (4)
 Randy Pereira – solo guitar (7)
 Omar Apollo – vocals (9)
 Lil Yachty – vocals (11)
 Miles Benjamin Robinson – guitar (11)
 Rei Brown – vocals (12)
 Benee – vocals (13)
 Yves Tumor – vocals (16)

Technical
 Chris Athens – mastering
 Rob Kinelski – mixing (1, 2, 4, 6–9, 11, 13, 17)
 Tristan Hoogland – mixing (3, 5, 10, 12, 15, 16, 18)
 Jeff Ellis – mixing (14) 
 George Miller – recording (1–3, 5, 9–13, 15, 16)
 Francisco Ramirez – recording (1, 2, 6–10, 14, 15, 18), mixing (6)
 Maximilian Jaeger – recording (4)
 Omar Apollo – recording (9)
 Lil Yachty – recording (11)
 Rei Brown – recording (12)
 Benee – recording (13)
 Josh Fountain – recording (13)
 Yves Tumor – recording (16)
 Julian Burg – engineering (4)
 Greg Kurstin – engineering (4)
 Casey Cuayo – mixing assistance (1, 2, 4, 6–9, 11, 13, 17)
 Eli Heisler – mixing assistance (1, 2, 9, 11, 13, 17)
 Nathan Phillips – mixing assistance (14)
 Alex Robles – engineering assistance (17)

Charts

Weekly charts

Year-end charts

Certifications

References

2020 albums
Joji (musician) albums
88rising albums
Albums postponed due to the COVID-19 pandemic